Scout's Honor... by Way of Blood is the debut solo studio album by American rapper Rampage. It was released on July 29, 1997, through Flipmode/Elektra Records. Production was mainly handled by DJ Scratch and Rashad Smith. It features guest appearances from Busta Rhymes, Spliff Star and Billy Lawrence among others. The album was a modest success, peaking at #65 on the Billboard 200 and #15 on the Top R&B/Hip-Hop Albums, and featuring two hit singles "Take It to the Streets" and "We Getz Down", which made it to #5 and #19 on the Hot Rap Singles.

Track listing

Samples
"Intro"
"Woman" by Neneh Cherry
"Flipmode Iz da Squad"
"General Confessional" by The Electric Prunes
"We Getz Down"
"She's Strange" by Cameo
"Wild for Da Night"
"American Fruit, African Roots" by Zulema
"Take It To The Streets"
"Blow Your Head" by Fred Wesley & the J.B.'s
"I Hear Music In The Streets" by Unlimited Touch
"Flipmode Enemy #1"
"Public Enemy #1" by Public Enemy

Charts

References

External links

1997 debut albums
Elektra Records albums
Rampage (rapper) albums
Albums produced by DJ Scratch
Albums produced by Rashad Smith
Conglomerate (record label) albums